Cyperus bernieri is a species of sedge that is endemic to eastern Madagascar.

The species was first formally described by the botanist Henri Chermezon in 1920.

See also
 List of Cyperus species

References

bernieri
Taxa named by Henri Chermezon
Plants described in 1920
Endemic flora of Madagascar